Hämeenkyrö is a municipality of Finland.

The neighboring municipalities of Hämeenkyrö are Ikaalinen, Nokia, Sastamala and Ylöjärvi. The municipality is unilingually Finnish.

The drinking horn depicting coat of arms of Hämeenkyrö was designed by Gustaf von Numers and it was confirmed in 1954. After the wars, the evacuated Karelian population from Otradnoye (Pyhäjärvi) was mostly settled in Hämeenkyrö.

Results of the 2021 Finnish municipal elections, resulted in the True Finns being the largest group on the Hämeenkyrö council, in Hämeenkyrö.

The name Hämeenkyrö comes from Finnish words "Häme" and "kyrö", which together mean a craggy and thicketed area located in the Tavastia region.

Transport
The private coach company OnniBus route Helsinki—Seinäjoki—Vaasa has a stop at Hämeenkyrö.

Distances from Hämeenkyrö 

 Helsinki 220 km
 Nokia 30 km
 Pori 95 km
 Tampere 40 km
 Lahti 150 km
 Turku 155 km
 Vaasa 200 km
 Oulu 390 km
 Rovaniemi 555 km
 Stockholm 375 km
 Tallin 260 km 
 St. Petersburg 430 km

Notable people
 
 
 Taavetti Kalliokorpi (1869–1949), Finnish farmer and politician
 Tapani Koivuniemi (born 1960), Finnish engineer, business founder
 Jyri Niemi (born 1990), Finnish professional ice hockey defenceman
 Mirja Ojanen (born 1967), Finnish ski-orienteering competitor
 Hans Osara (c.1560–1601), Finnish lieutenant at the Cudgel War
 Frans Eemil Sillanpää (1888–1964), Finnish writer, Nobel Laureate in Literature
 Arvo Tuominen (1894–1981), Finnish journalist, politician and author
 Ilkka Tuomisto (born 1984), Finnish Paralympic cross-country skier and biathlete
 Iivari Yrjölä (1899–1985), Finnish athlete
 Matti Yrjölä (born 1938), Finnish shot putter
 Paavo Yrjölä (1902–1980), Finnish track and field athlete

References

External links 

Municipality of Hämeenkyrö – Official website 
Arteles International Artist in Residency Program